State consequentialism, also known as Mohist consequentialism, is a consequentialist ethical theory which evaluates the moral worth of an action based on how it contributes to the basic goods of a state, through social order, material wealth, and population growth. According to the Stanford Encyclopedia of Philosophy, Mohist consequentialism, dating back to the 5th century BC, is the "world's earliest form of consequentialism, a remarkably sophisticated version based on a plurality of intrinsic goods taken as constitutive of human welfare". The term state consequentialism has also been applied to the political philosophy of the Confucian philosopher Xunzi.</p>
Although the scholars cited above have suggested that Mohist consequentialism is a type of state consequentialism, a 2016 study of Mohism argues that this interpretation is mistaken, since the Mohists hold that right and wrong are determined by what benefits all the people of the world, not by what benefits the state. The Mohists' concern is to benefit all people, considered as an aggregate or a community, not to benefit a particular political entity, such as the state.

Consequentialism

Unlike utilitarianism, which views pleasure as a moral good, "the basic goods in Mohist consequentialist thinking are... order, material wealth, and increase in population". During Mozi's era, war and famines were common, and population growth was seen as a moral necessity for a harmonious society. The "material wealth" of Mohist consequentialism refers to basic needs like shelter and clothing, and the "order" of Mohist consequentialism refers to Mozi's stance against warfare and violence, which he viewed as pointless and a threat to social stability. Stanford sinologist David Shepherd Nivison, in The Cambridge History of Ancient China, writes that the moral goods of Mohism "are interrelated: more basic wealth, then more reproduction; more people, then more production and wealth... if people have plenty, they would be good, filial, kind, and so on unproblematically". The Mohists believed that morality is based on "promoting the benefit of all under heaven and eliminating harm to all under heaven". In contrast to Bentham's views, state consequentialism is not utilitarian because it is not hedonistic or individualistic. The importance of outcomes that are good for the community outweigh the importance of individual pleasure and pain.

References 

Mohism
Consequentialism
Legalism (Chinese philosophy)